Coogee Beach may refer to:

Coogee, New South Wales, beach in Sydney, NSW, Australia 
Coogee, Western Australia, beach in Perth, WA, Australia